Eberholzen is a village and a former municipality in the district of Hildesheim in Lower Saxony, Germany. Since 1 November 2016, it is part of the municipality Sibbesse.

History 
Eberholzen is a very old village. The first mention of the village, which was originally called Eilbereholthusen, was in a document which was written in 1240. According to this document Eberholzen was tributary to a monastery in the nearby village of Escherde.

Sights 
The tower of the Protestant church dates back to the 12th century. A medieval stone coffin can be seen in front of the church. According to a legend, it belonged to Ritter von Eberhardt, a knight who was banned and not buried on the cemetery of Eberholzen.
Several well-preserved half-timbered houses are sightworthy in the middle of the village.

Infrastructure 
Unlike many villages in Lower Saxony, Eberholzen has still a traditional village shop. There is also a well-known butcher's shop. There is a bus service to Hildesheim and Alfeld, with several trips each day.

References

External links 

Hildesheim (district)
Former municipalities in Lower Saxony